Eray İşcan (born 19 July 1991) is a Turkish professional footballer who plays as a goalkeeper.

Club career
İşcan made his debut in 2013. He was also at the starting lineup list at 2013–14 UEFA Champions League group stage matches against Copenhagen and Real Madrid.

Career statistics
.

Club

Honours
Galatasaray
Süper Lig (3): 2012–13, 2014–15, 2017–18
Türkiye Kupası (3): 2013–14, 2014–15, 2015–16
Süper Kupa (3): 2013, 2015, 2016

External links
 Profile at Galatasaray.org
 
 
 

1991 births
Sportspeople from Zonguldak
Living people
Turkish footballers
Turkey youth international footballers
Association football goalkeepers
Galatasaray A2 footballers
Galatasaray S.K. footballers
Kayserispor footballers
Yeni Malatyaspor footballers
Ankara Keçiörengücü S.K. footballers
Süper Lig players
TFF First League players